Stolen Harmony is a 1935 American crime film directed by Alfred L. Werker and starring George Raft, Ben Bernie and Grace Bradley. It is a semi-musical, featuring Big Band numbers. It was produced and distributed by Paramount Pictures.

Plot
A saxophone-player/dancer (George Raft) joins a Big Band upon his release from jail.  The film climaxes with a car chase.

Cast
George Raft as Ray Angelo
Ben Bernie as Jack Conrad
Grace Bradley as Jean Loring
 Iris Adrian as Sunny Verne
Lloyd Nolan as Chesty Burrage
 Goodee Montgomery as 	Lil Davis
 Charles Arnt as 	Clem Walters
Purv Pullen as Little Nell (uncredited)
Ruth Clifford As Nurse (uncredited)
Jane Wyman as Chorus Girl (uncredited)
Bess Flowers as Musician (uncredited)
Carol Holloway As 6 Children members (uncredited)
Fred Toones as Henry (uncredited)
William Cagney as "Schoolboy" (lookalike brother of James Cagney)

Production
The film was based on an original story by Leon Gordon and was announced in December 1934. From the beginning it was envisioned as a vehicle for George Raft and bandleader Ben Bernie.

References

External links

1935 films
Films directed by Alfred L. Werker
1935 crime films
American black-and-white films
1935 musical films
American crime films
American musical films
1930s English-language films
1930s American films
Paramount Pictures films